Bacchisa siamensis is a species of beetle in the family Cerambycidae. It was described by Breuning in 1959. It is known from Thailand.

References

External links 
 

S
Beetles described in 1959